The Ghana women's national field hockey team represents Ghana in women's international field hockey competitions.

Ghana participated in the Hockey World League in (2016–2017).  In Round 1, they played in the African group with Kenya and Nigeria, winning both pool matches. In Round 2, which was played in Valencia in February 2017, they finished in 8th position.

Trainings and matches in preparation for international tournaments are held at the Theodosia Okoh Hockey Stadium in Accra.

Tournament history

Africa Cup of Nations
2005 – 
2009 – 
2013 – 
2017 – 
2022 –

African Games
1995 – 6th
2003 – 4th
 2023 – Qualified

African Olympic Qualifier
2007 – 
2011 – 
2015 – 
2019 –

Commonwealth Games
 2018 – 10th
 2022 – 10th

Hockey World League
2012–13 – 27th
2014–15 – 34th
2016–17 – 34th

See also
Ghana men's national field hockey team

References

External links
FIH profile

African women's national field hockey teams
Field hockey
Nationla team